The Cuyahoga County Sheriff's Office is the primary law enforcement agency for Cuyahoga County, Ohio. The current interim sheriff is Joseph Greiner, who was named to the post on February 16, 2023. It provides correctional, civil, and law enforcement services to the county. It is the only County in Ohio that has an appointed Sheriff rather than an elected one.

History
The first sheriff, Smith Balwin was elected in 1810.

In 1982, press reports indicated indiscipline in the county jail. Organized crime figures were being given special privileges they used to continue their rackets from behind bars.

In 1997, the New York Times reported the FBI claimed a guard at the jail was selling drugs and claimed to be part of a ring of several dozen local officers who protected local drug dealers.

In May 2009, Sheriff Gerald McFaul Sr. was forced to resign after press reports of his corruption. He was accepting cash payments from employees for promotions and other favors. He was later convicted on corruption charges. As a result of this scandal, the position of sheriff was made one that was appointed by county officials. McFaul was replaced by Sheriff Bob Reid, who was then chief of police in Bedford, Ohio. Reid was asked to resign in January  2013.

The CCSD established a Use of Deadly Force Investigation Unit in 2015. One of the primary objectives of this unit is to provide a standard, comprehensive, neutral investigative response to use of deadly force incidents. This team, composed of specially trained Detectives, acts as an independent investigative unit that, when requested, investigates and reviews police use of deadly force incidents for requesting law enforcement entities. In 2015, the UDF team investigated 6 incidents.

The jail suffered eight inmate deaths in 2018 culminating in the resignation of the head of the jail. His successor, Eric Ivey, was indicted in 2019 on charges of tampering with evidence to hide problems at the facility. In April 2019, five jailers were taken into custody by their own department on charges of turning off cameras, restraining and beating people, and other misconduct.

Gallery

References

Government of Cuyahoga County, Ohio
Sheriffs' offices of Ohio